Lo-Pan may refer to:
 Lo-Pan, a character in the 1986 film Big Trouble in Little China
 Lo-Pan (band), a hard rock band from Columbus, Ohio

See also
 Lo Pan Temple, a historic building in Hong Kong
 Lopan River, a river in Russia
 Lo Pan, also transliterated as Lu Ban, the patron saint of Chinese builders and contractors